Issé is a commune on the banks of the river Don in the Loire-Atlantique department in western France. It is situated 10 km southeast of Châteaubriant.

Population

Transport
The train station reopened in 2014, serving tram-trains from the Pays de la Loire.

See also
Communes of the Loire-Atlantique department

References

Communes of Loire-Atlantique